Ambrose MacDermott (?–September 1717) was an Irish Roman Catholic bishop.  He served as the Bishop of Elphin from 1707 to 1717.

References

17th-century births
1717 deaths
Roman Catholic bishops of Elphin